Victor Alexander Sereld Hay, 21st Earl of Erroll and 4th Baron Kilmarnock, KCMG (17 October 1876 – 20 February 1928), styled Lord Hay from 1876 to 1891 and Lord Kilmarnock from 1891 to 1927, was a British diplomat, a writer and briefly a member of the House of Lords, who was "noted for his tact and charm."

Early life
Erroll was the first son of Charles Hay, 20th Earl of Erroll (1852–1927) and his wife Mary Caroline L'Estrange. He was a godson of Queen Victoria and a favourite of George V and Queen Mary, who often invited him to Balmoral Castle.

Through his paternal grandfather, the 19th Earl of Erroll, he was a direct descendant of William IV (his great-grandmother Elizabeth Hay, Countess of Erroll, wife of the 18th Earl of Erroll, was King William's daughter by his mistress Dorothea Jordan. His maternal grandfather was General the Hon. Sir Charles Stephen Gore, KH, GCB, a Waterloo officer (who was a son of the 2nd Earl of Arran and brother to the Duchess of Inverness). His maternal grandparents were Edmund L'Estrange and Lady Harriett L'Estrange (sister of Richard Lumley, 9th Earl of Scarbrough, and daughter of Frederick Lumley-Savile and of Charlotte De la Poer-Beresford, a daughter of George de la Poer Beresford, Bishop of Kilmore).

Career
The young Hay entered the diplomatic service and was promoted Attaché, 1900, Third Secretary in July 1902, Second Secretary, 1906, First Secretary, 1913. He was First Secretary in Copenhagen, 1918–19, then briefly Chargé d'Affaires in Berlin, on the United Kingdom's resumption of diplomatic relations with Germany in 1920, until the arrival of a British Ambassador. He remained in Berlin as Counsellor until November, 1921, and served finally as British High Commissioner to the Inter-Allied Rhineland High Commission, from December 1920 until his death in February 1928.

He was also an author and belonged to the St James's Club. He had two plays published and produced in London, The Dream Kios and The Anonymous Letter.

He succeeded his father in the earldom in 1927.

Personal life
In 1900, he married Mary Lucy Victoria Mackenzie, only daughter of Sir Allan Mackenzie, 2nd Baronet, of Glen Muick, Aberdeenshire. She inherited a fortune made by her grandfather in the indigo trade in India. Together, they were the parents of two sons and one daughter:

 Josslyn Victor Hay, 22nd Earl of Erroll (1901–1941), who married Lady Idina Sackville, daughter of the 8th Earl De La Warr, in 1923.
 Gilbert Boyd, 6th Baron Kilmarnock (1903–1975), who married The Hon. Rosemary Guest, daughter of Ivor Guest, 1st Viscount Wimborne. He married, secondly, Denise Coker. He changed his surname to Boyd in 1941 to inherit the barony of Kilmarnock after the death of his brother without male issue.
 Lady Rosemary Hay, who married Lt.-Col. Rupert Ryan. She married, secondly, Maj. James Gresham.

He held the earldom only briefly, and was succeeded by his elder son, Lord Kilmarnock, in 1928. Today, his son and heir is best known for the unsolved case surrounding his murder and the sensation it caused during wartime in Britain.

Shooting incident
On Wednesday 31 August 1910, Lord Kilmarnock was one of a shooting party at Balmoral, with George V and friends. Captain Hood (later to become a rear admiral) accidentally shot Kilmarnock, who was in a shooting butt near him. Kilmarnock's glasses were broken, and he sustained a "slight abrasion". The Buchan Observer reported:

It appears that the accident happened about two o'clock in the afternoon, and that Captain Hood was in the next butt to his Lordship. Captain Hood got on to the line of a bird just crossing between his butt and that of Lord Kilmarnock who was facing him. When the trigger was pulled Lord Kilmarnock at once shouted to his companion who ceased firing immediately. At the close of the drive he reported the accident to the King, who expressed sympathy with both Lord Kilmarnock and Captain Hood. His Lordship continued shooting all the afternoon, and it was not until after dinner that Dr Mitchell was sent for. Captain Hood, who was greatly upset at the accident, left the hill and returned to Braemar a short time after the occurrence.

There followed "exaggerated reports" of the incident, which Kilmarnock denied, saying that he dined with the king on the Thursday night. One of those reports, by The Darling Downs Gazette (Toowoomba), reported that it was George V who had shot Kilmarnock, that Kilmarnock was "badly wounded", and that "the most desperate efforts have been made to hush the whole thing up".

Publications
Ferelith, 1903
The Dream Kiss (play), produced at the Wimbledon Theatre, 1924
The Anonymous Letter (play), produced at Q Theatre, 1927

Ancestry

References

External links

1876 births
1928 deaths
British diplomats
Diplomatic peers
21
Knights Commander of the Order of St Michael and St George
Inter-Allied Rhineland High Commission
British people of World War I